The Kirovabad pogrom or the pogrom of Kirovabad was an Azeri-led ethnic cleansing that targeted Armenians living in the city of Kirovabad (today called Ganja) in Soviet Azerbaijan during November 1988.

Pogrom 
An unidentified Armenian press editor said the commander of the Soviet troops asked the Interior Ministry in Moscow for permission to evacuate some of the city's Armenian population of 100,000. The conflict intensified in the fall of 1988, as the Armenians of Kirovabad and the surrounding countryside were driven from their homes and forced to seek safe haven in Armenia. According to Los Angeles Times, an article published on November 27, 1988, "Soviet soldiers have blocked dozens of Azerbaijani attempts to massacre Armenians in their homes in the continuing communal violence in the southern Soviet republic of Azerbaijan, a senior military commander there said Saturday." Over 40,000 Armenians were forced to leave Kirovabad (now Ganja). 

On November 23, martial law was declared in Kirovabad, meaning that troops could now respond with rifle fire. That same day, an attempt of pogrom against the building of the city's Executive committee took place. During the clashes between the aggressive crowd and the armed forces who tried to keep the order and to defend the Armenian citizens three soldiers were killed, and 67 people were wounded. Hooligans burned down and damaged military vehicles.

Death toll 
Yuri Rost mentions sources reporting that the number of fatalities had risen to forty by 24 November, one third of whom were Azerbaijanis killed in clashes with the Soviet troops. Human rights activists reported, that up to 130 Armenians were killed in Kirovabad alone and "with warnings of possible genocide, they have appealed for swift action by the government to halt Azerbaijani attacks on Armenians." On 25 November 1988, Soviet human rights activist Andrei Sakharov, in Massachusetts during the unrest, said he had received reports from the Soviet Union that more than 130 Armenians were killed and more than 200 wounded in the violence. However the Soviet authorities denied Sakharov's claims, with Foreign Ministry spokesman Gennady Gerasimov saying that the information about the casualties was not accurate. The New York Times also reported that "official and unofficial informants in the two republics who have provided reliable reports during the last nine months of unrest discounted the higher figures, saying they were based on second- and third-hand accounts". Later Sakharov admitted in his memoirs that his statement was a mistake and that he should not have used concrete figures about the numbers of Armenian casualties in Kirovabad. He wrote:

The Soviet authorities confirmed the death of 7 people at the time of the events. This figure included 3 Soviet soldiers, 3 Azerbaijanis and 1 Armenian. Angus Roxburgh during the violence reported that at least six more Armenians were killed due to ethnic cleansing in Kirovabad.

See also 
Sumgait pogrom (1988)
Baku pogrom (1990)
Maraga Massacre (1992)
Anti-Armenianism
List of massacres in Azerbaijan

References

External links 
Participant of self-defense operations in Kirovabad: In critical situations, we always win if we are united
Pogroms in Kirovabad - MIATSUM

First Nagorno-Karabakh War
Anti-Armenianism in Azerbaijan
Conflicts in 1988
Azerbaijan Soviet Socialist Republic
Armenian Soviet Socialist Republic
Mass murder in 1988
1988 in Armenia
1988 in the Soviet Union
Massacres in Azerbaijan
Anti-Armenian pogroms
History of Ganja, Azerbaijan
Riots and civil disorder in the Soviet Union
Persecution of Oriental Orthodox Christians
November 1988 events in Asia